A pork pie is a type of meat pie.

Pork pie may also refer to:

 Pork Pie (film), a 2017 remake of New Zealand film Goodbye Pork Pie
 Porkpie (TV series), a British sitcom
 pork pie hat
 Pork Pie Percussion, a drum company started in 1987 by Bill Detamore

People 
 Jonny Porkpie (born 1974), New York City-based writer and director